Gene Howard (born December 22, 1946) is a former American football cornerback in the National Football League. He was drafted by the New Orleans Saints in the seventh round of the 1968 NFL Draft. He played college football at Langston University.

Howard also played for the Los Angeles Rams.

1946 births
Living people
American football cornerbacks
Langston Lions football players
New Orleans Saints players
Los Angeles Rams players